Janetogalathea californiensis is a species of squat lobster in a monotypic genus in the family Galatheidae.

References

Squat lobsters
Monotypic arthropod genera